Caloptilia hemiconis is a moth of the family Gracillariidae. It is known from India, Indonesia (Bali and Java), Myanmar and Thailand.

References

hemiconis
Moths of Asia
Moths described in 1932